13th Star is an album by Fish. Released as a limited edition via mail-order in September 2007 and to retail in February 2008, it is his ninth solo studio album since he left Marillion in 1988 and the first since Field of Crows (2004). Released on Fish's own imprint Chocolate Frog Records, retail distribution is handled by Snapper Music.

Music and lyrics
Steve Vantsis, who was Fish's permanent bassist from the Sunsets on Empire tour (1997) until 2008, was the main writing partner on this album (a role previously held by, among others, Mickey Simmonds, Steven Wilson, John Wesley and Bruce Watson). It features a rougher, more guitar-based and slightly industrial sound on a number of tracks and is therefore perceived as a departure by many fans. However, Fish had explored similar ideas as early as on Sunsets on Empire and Raingods with Zippos (1999). Also, a number of tracks have classic Fish hallmarks, significantly enhanced by the presence of his longtime companion Frank Usher on guitars.

Most lyrics deal with, or are at least implicitly in reference to, Fish's failed relationship with Mostly Autumn singer Heather Findlay who left him in 2007, cancelling their scheduled wedding. The title 13th Star originally referred to her as being the 13th female significant other in Fish's life, but ended up as a metaphor for an (unknown) future relationship.  The original title of the song "Zoë 25" was "Micklegate", after the place where Fish had proposed to Heather. The title also refers to the album as the 13th studio album of his career (four with Marillion and nine solo).

Musicians
Steve Vantsis, previously strictly the bassist, emerges as the dominant musician on the album. Apart from most of the songwriting, he is also responsible for electric and acoustic guitars and keyboards. The main guitarist is once again Frank Usher, who also co-wrote one song ("Openwater"). Keyboards are handled by Foss Paterson, returning into the line-up for the first time since 1997 (except for a brief one-off stint on the 2000 tour of Bosnia). He also co-wrote the only other non-Vantsis song on the album, the piano ballad "Miles de Besos". Further guitar credits go to Chris Johnson (of The Evernauts and Mostly Autumn), who is also the second guitarist on the tour. Another Mostly Autumn connection is former Karnataka drummer Gavin Griffiths, who played with them for most of 2007. Dave Haswell, who had already contributed to Fish's previous three studio albums, plays additional percussion. Female backing vocals are by Lorna Bannon, who had appeared on Songs from the Mirror, Suits and Sunsets on Empire.

The album was produced by Calum Malcolm, who had mixed and/or (re)mastered several Fish albums before.

Cover art
The cover was designed by Fish's long-time collaborator, artist Mark Wilkinson. Although Wilkinson had designed all official album releases by Fish (with the exception of Songs from The Mirror), the more recent ones had largely been computer-aided ones, while the cover of the previous album Field of Crows emulated Vincent van Gogh's style. By contrast, the artwork for 13th Star, spreading across three sides a fold-out digipak and the booklet, marked a return to Wilkinson's hallmark airbrush style that had been a characteristic feature of the Fish-era Marillion gatefold covers as well as Fish's first solo album Vigil in a Wilderness of Mirrors (1989). A vinyl  version of the album was released in a gatefold cover whose large format is better suited to the scope of Wilkinson's painting. The image of the "Dark Angel" navigating his boat from the booklet's front cover illustrates the style and atmosphere of the artwork for this album.

Formats
The limited version (10,000 copies) that was made available by mail order only on 6 September 2007 was a digipak with three panels which contained a bonus "making-of" DVD and a 20-page colour booklet. The digipak is in a "spot-varnished" closed slipcase with the Fish logo over the Egyptian "star" design. The slipcase is usually shown as the cover in reviews and catalogues.
The retail version available from 12 February 2008 was a standard jewel case CD provided in a slipcase open on two sides.
In May 2008, a limited edition (2,500 copies) double vinyl gatefold album was released as a mail order only release. It has the regular CD tracks spread across the first three of four sides, while the fourth side contains live versions of "Circle Line", "Dark Star" and "13th Star". 
Download versions of the album are available from Fish's website and iTunes.

Singles
The track "Arc of the Curve" is released as a single on 3 March 2008. The CD version contains only two tracks (the album version and an edited version of the title track), however, a download version including three live tracks is available from iTunes. On 6 October 2008, "Zoe 25" was released as the second single along with two live tracks (download and CD version).

Tour
Fish first presented the album on the European Clutching at Stars tour which began in the summer of 2007. In addition to focusing on the 13th Star material, the tour celebrated the 20th anniversary of Clutching at Straws (Fish's last album with Marillion), and so most of the set list was drawn from these two releases. This tour covered the spring and summer of 2008, with Fish giving a meet-and-greet for some fans before each show.

Track listing
"Circle Line" (Dick, Vantsis) – 6:04
"Square Go" (Dick, Vantsis) – 5:31
"Miles de Besos" (Dick, Paterson) – 4:22
"Zoë  25" (Dick, Vantsis) – 5.19
"Arc of the Curve" (Dick, Vantsis) – 4:29
"Manchmal" (Dick, Vantsis) – 5:42
"Openwater" (Dick, Usher) – 5:07
"Dark Star" (Dick, Vantsis) – 6:48
"Where in the World" (Dick, Vantsis) – 6:05
"13th Star" (Dick, Vantsis) – 5:41

Total time: 55:30

Personnel
Fish (Derek W. Dick) – All Vocals / Lyrics
Frank Usher – Electric Guitars; Acoustic Guitars (Tracks 3-5,9,10); Loop Guitar (1); Lap Steel (5)
Steve Vantsis – Bass Guitars; Electric Guitars (2,4,6,7 and 8); Acoustic Guitars (1,4,10); Keyboards (1,2,4,6,8-10); Upright Bass (3); Clavinet (2); Drum Loop and Programming; Samples
Chris Johnson – Electric Guitars; Acoustic Guitars (4,5 and 9)
Foss Patterson – Piano (1,3-5); Keyboards (1-4,6-9); Organ (1-4,6-10); Strings (1-5,8-10); Music Box (4); Dulcimer; Accordion; Samples (10)
Gavin Griffiths – Drums
Dave Haswell – Percussion (1,3-5 and 10)
Lorna Bannon – Backing Vocals (3-6,9,10)

References

2007 albums
Fish (singer) albums